Kurum (fl. late 3rd millennium BCE) was the 10th Gutian ruler of the Gutian Dynasty of Sumer, mentioned on the "Sumerian King List" (SKL). According to the SKL; Kurum was the successor of Yarla. Apilkin then succeeded Kurum, likewise according to the SKL.

See also

 History of Sumer
 List of Mesopotamian dynasties

References

Gutian dynasty of Sumer